Angelica glauca, the smooth angelica, is a species of flowering plant in the family Apiaceae. It is found from eastern Afghanistan through the western Himalayas to western Tibet. Collecting in the wild for its essential oil has driven this species to Endangered status.

References

glauca
Flora of Afghanistan
Flora of Pakistan
Flora of West Himalaya
Flora of Tibet
Plants described in 1846